Secret Six may refer to:
Secret Six, a group of six men who secretly funded American abolitionist John Brown
Secret Six (Chicago), a group of six men who organized the Chicago business community against gangster Al Capone
Secret Six (comics), various fictional teams in the DC Comics Universe
The Secret Six, 1931 film.
The Secret 6 was the title of four hero pulps written by Robert J Hogan and published by "Popular Publications" about a secret group of mystery crime fighters. The title ran from October 1934 to January 1935, inclusive.